"Pretty Persuasion" is a song by R.E.M. that was first released on the band's 1984 album Reckoning. It was released as a promotional single and reached number 44 on Billboard's Rock Tracks chart. According to R.E.M. biographer Tony Fletcher, it is often regarded as "the 'archetypal' R.E.M. anthem".

Background 
Although not released commercially until 1984, R.E.M. performed "Pretty Persuasion" live in concert as early as 1980 and 1981. A live version of the song was recorded for the band's 1983 debut album Murmur but was not released on that album, although the recording was eventually included as a bonus track on a 1992 release of Reckoning. Producer Mitch Easter wanted to record the song again for Reckoning but the band, particularly lead singer Michael Stipe who no longer liked the song, was initially reluctant. They eventually agreed to a multi-track studio recording for Reckoning due to the popularity of the song live with fans.

Content

Lyrical themes 
Allmusic critic Bill Janovitz describes the lyrics as "an anti-consumerism take on advertising." The song makes the point right away with the lines:
It's what I want
Hurry and buy
All has been tried
Follow reason and buy.

Style and composition 
As with many R.E.M. songs, the refrain, "He's got pretty persuasion/She's got pretty persuasion/God damn your confusion" is, as described by Fletcher, concise and repetitive.  R.E.M. guitarist Peter Buck has stated that the song was originally inspired by a dream Stipe had. In the dream, Stipe was photographing the Rolling Stones for the cover of their last single, which in the dream was entitled "Pretty Persuasion".

The song begins with a guitar riff based on descending arpeggios. Easter has noted a musical similarity to Todd Rundgren's 1972 song "Couldn't I Just Tell You" and thinks the earlier song provided some inspiration for "Pretty Persuasion". Janovitz notes similarities with songs by The Byrds. These include the guitar riffs, which although played on two six-string guitars, produce an "electric-guitar jangle" similar to that achieved by The Byrds' Roger McGuinn on his 12-string Rickenbacker guitar. They also include the multi-track vocals by Stipe and bassist Mike Mills, which evoke The Byrds' vocal harmonies. However, the vocals on "Pretty Persuasion" are not precisely enunciated, making the lyrics difficult to decipher at times.
Spin critics Eric Weisbard and Craig Marks described "Pretty Persuasion" as "a great rocker."

Performances 
In addition to being played live in the early portion of R.E.M.'s career, "Pretty Persuasion" was included in the live set as late as 2007 and 2008. Fletcher regards it as one of the songs that influenced R.E.M.'s 2008 album Accelerate. A live version from this tour was released on the 2009 live album Live at the Olympia. "Pretty Persuasion" has also been included on several of R.E.M.'s compilation albums, including The Best of R.E.M. in 1991 and And I Feel Fine... The Best of the I.R.S. Years 1982–1987 in 2006.

Music video

This song, and others from the album, is part of a short film called "Left of Reckoning", directed by James Herbert. The four-minute clip has the band wandering around folk artist R.A. Miller's Whirligig Farm in Rabbittown, Georgia.

References

1984 songs
R.E.M. songs
Songs written by Bill Berry
Songs written by Michael Stipe
Songs written by Peter Buck
Songs written by Mike Mills
Song recordings produced by Mitch Easter
Song recordings produced by Don Dixon (musician)
American punk rock songs